is a Japanese interior designer. Principal of Wonderwall Inc., and professor at Musashino Art University.

The Emporium (completed in 2014) was selected as "9 of the World's Most Beautifully Designed Malls" in Architectural Digest.
Katayama received Frame Awards 2020 Lifetime Achievement Award.

References

Japanese businesspeople
1966 births
Living people